The Future is the third studio album by American rock band Nathaniel Rateliff & the Night Sweats. It was released on November 5, 2021 by Stax Records. The album was produced by Brad Cook and R.M.B. (consisting of Rateliff, Patrick Meese, and James Barone) with additional production by Elijah Thompson.

Background
The band recorded The Future in Rateliff's Broken Creek Studio outside of Denver and wrote songs that reflected on times during the COVID-19 pandemic. In a press release, Rateliff said of the recording process: "When I was writing the record, we were in the middle of a pandemic and our future looked pretty bleak. I just continue to try to write from a place of hope. Then my own neurosis, and maybe being a Libra gets in the way, and I can’t make up my mind. There is this constant back-and-forth battle in me personally and I am sure that comes out in my writing."

Singles
The album's lead single "Survivor" was released on August 18, 2021. The song peaked at number 46 on the Hot Rock & Alternative Songs chart.

Promotional singles
The album's first promotional single "Love Don't" was released on September 26, 2021 followed by "What If I" on October 15, 2021.

Critical reception

Upon its release, The Future received positive reviews from critics. At Metacritic, which assigns a normalized rating out of 100 based on reviews from mainstream publications, the album received an average score of 79 based on 8 reviews, indicating "generally favorable reviews".

Track listing

Charts

Weekly charts

References

2021 albums
Nathaniel Rateliff albums
Stax Records albums